BNS Durjoy is a  semi-stealth large patrol craft (LPC) of the Bangladesh Navy. She is the first ship of the class. She entered service with the Bangladesh Navy in 2013.

Design
The ship has a bulbous bow that suggests it is very stable in heavy sea states. It has speed and range to support long lasting missions. It has a complement of 60. This ship is able to perform limited anti-submarine warfare operations too.

Armament
The LPC is armed with a single 76.2 mm H/PJ-26 naval gun and four C-704 surface-to-surface missiles (SSM) mounted aft. It is also equipped with two dual Oerlikon 20 mm cannon mounted amidships which can be used for anti-aircraft role. For ASW role it has two forward-mounted 6-tube EDS-25A 250 mm ASW rocket launchers and decoy launchers.

Electronics
The primary sensor of the ship is a SR47AG surface and air search radar. The ship carries a Chinese TR47C fire control radar for main gun. For navigation, the ship uses the Japanese JMA 3336 radar. To help the navigational radar, the Vision Master chart radar is used. A JRCSS combat management system (CMS) with at least three multifunction consoles is also fitted in the ships.

Career
BNS Durjoy was launched at Wuchang Shipyard of China on August 26, 2012. She reached Bangladesh in February 2013. On August 29, 2013, she commissioned into the Bangladesh Navy as BNS Durjoy.

The ship took part in Cooperation Afloat Readiness and Training(CARAT), an annual bilateral exercise with United States Navy, in 2015.

See also
 List of active ships of the Bangladesh Navy

References

Ships built in China
Durjoy-class LPC
2012 ships
Ships of the Bangladesh Navy
Patrol vessels of the Bangladesh Navy